Sullurpeta railway station, located in the Indian state of Andhra Pradesh, serves Sullurpeta in Tirupati district.

History
The Vijayawada–Chennai link was established in 1899.

The Chirala–Elavur section was electrified in 1980–81.

Station

Sullurpeta station has three platforms. Each day, 39 trains pass through this station and four trains originate from here.

Amenities
Sullurpeta station has computerised reservation facilities (with all-India linkage), waiting room and retiring room.

References

Railway stations in Nellore district
Chennai railway division
Railway stations in India opened in 1899